The 2018 South American Cricket Championship was a cricket tournament took place in Mosquera near Bogotá, Colombia from 23 to 26 August 2018. This was the fifteenth edition of the men's South American Cricket Championship. Unlike the women's event, which took place simultaneously, matches played in the men's event did not have official Twenty20 International status. The ICC granted Twenty20 International (T20I) status to matches between all of its Members, starting from 1 July 2018 for women's team but not until 1 January 2019 for the men. Argentina were the defending champions having won the event in 2017, but were represented by a development squad, Argentina A.

The eight participating teams were the national sides of hosts Colombia, along with Argentina A, Brazil, Chile, Mexico, Peru, Uruguay and Costa Rica who were making their debut in the South American Championship. Mexico went undefeated throughout the tournament and defeated Uruguay by six wickets in the final.

Squads

Round-robin

Points table

Final

See also
 2018 South American Women's Cricket Championship

References

External links
 Series home at CricHQ

Men's South American Cricket Championship
International cricket competitions in 2018